The Ispahani Hangar is a Pakistan International Airlines wide-body aircraft maintenance hangar at the Jinnah International Airport in Karachi, Pakistan. It was named in honour of Mirza Ahmad Ispahani, the first and longest serving chairman of Pakistan International Airlines (PIA). The hangar for wide body and narrow body aircraft with a supporting airframe overhaul shop was completed and commissioned in 1968.

The hangars in Karachi are used for checks and maintenance of aircraft operated by PIA and by other airlines such as Philippine Airlines, Iran Air and Turkish Airlines.

See also 
 List of airports in Pakistan
 Airlines of Pakistan
 Pakistan Civil Aviation Authority
 Shaheen Airport Services
 Transport in Pakistan
 Pakistan International Airlines

External links 
 PIA History 1961-1970
 PIA General History
 Photos of Ispahani Hangar
 Photo of Hangar, August 2002

Aircraft hangars
Jinnah International Airport
Pakistan International Airlines